Coeruna (Koeruna) is an extinct Witotoan language of Brazil.

References

Witotoan languages
Extinct languages of South America
Languages of Brazil